Calvin Kang (Kang Li Loong, ; born 16 April 1990) is a track and field sprint athlete who competes internationally for Singapore. He specialises in the 100m sprint, but also runs the 200m and 4 × 100 m events.

Personal life
Kang attended Victoria School and Singapore Sports School. Upon graduation from Singapore Sports School, Kang entered Nanyang Technological University to pursue his undergraduate degree in sport science and management in 2011 before deciding to defer his studies to train professionally in 2013.

Career
He represented Singapore at the 2008 Summer Olympics in Beijing in the 100m sprint and placed 6th in his heat without advancing to the second round. He ran a time of 10.73 seconds, 0.2 seconds outside his national junior record time of 10.53 seconds. Kang has represented Singapore at four major competitions – Southeast Asian Games (Nakhon Ratchasima, 2007), Summer Olympic Games (Beijing, 2008), Commonwealth Games (Delhi, 2010) and Asian Games (Guangzhou, 2010), making him the only Singaporean athlete to do so before the age of 20.

In the 2011 Southeast Asian Games held in Indonesia, Kang ran in the 4 × 100 m relay with his teammates and achieved the silver medal with a timing of 39.91 seconds.

In August 2013, Kang was the sole representative of Singapore in the IAAF World Championships 2013 held in Moscow. Clocking a time of 10.52 seconds in the men's 100m event, Kang finished first in heat 4 of the preliminaries and equalled his personal best. He later ran a time of 10.66 seconds in his heat.

In the 2015 Southeast Asian Games held in Singapore, Kang and his team, consisting of Muhammad Amirudin, Lee Cheng Wei and Gary Yeo, set a new national record of 39.24 seconds for the 4 × 100 m relay, beating the previous record of 39.45 seconds. The timing earned them a silver medal, narrowly losing the gold medal to the Thai team. Kang also ran a personal best 100m timing of 10.47 seconds, but missed out on a podium placing as he came in 4th.

Kang has had the backing of several notable sponsors such as MILO (under Nestle Singapore) from 2008 to 2014 and 100PLUS in 2015 to present. He has been featured prominently in their campaigns, and was affectionately known as the "MILO boy" for the duration of his MILO sponsorship.

Besides excelling at athletics, Kang has ventured into several entrepreneurship undertakings, such as the director of community partnerships in Shiok SG, a local social enterprise, and the lead trainer at The Impressionist, an agency that specialises in imparting interview skills.

References

External links
 

 
 
 
 
 
 Calvin Kang Interview
 

1990 births
Living people
Singaporean male sprinters
Olympic athletes of Singapore
Athletes (track and field) at the 2008 Summer Olympics
Victoria School, Singapore alumni
Singapore Sports School alumni
Athletes (track and field) at the 2010 Asian Games
Athletes (track and field) at the 2014 Asian Games
Athletes (track and field) at the 2014 Commonwealth Games
Commonwealth Games competitors for Singapore
World Athletics Championships athletes for Singapore
Asian Games competitors for Singapore
Southeast Asian Games medalists in athletics
Southeast Asian Games silver medalists for Singapore
Competitors at the 2011 Southeast Asian Games
Competitors at the 2015 Southeast Asian Games